Alasdair Duncan (born 22 November 1982) is an Australian author and journalist, based in Brisbane. He wrote for the weekly music magazine Rave, where he published interviews with Cut Copy, LCD Soundsystem, M.I.A. and Soulwax, and is a currently a contributor to The Brag and Beat magazines.

Duncan is the author of the novel Sushi Central, which was published under the title Dance, Recover, Repeat in the U.S. by MTV Books. His second novel, Metro, was published in Australia in August 2006, and was released in the UK by Burning House Books in February 2008.

Since 2008, Duncan has been a member of the judging panel for the State Library of Queensland's Young Writers Award.

Published works

References

External links
 Duncan on ABC Unleashed

1982 births
21st-century Australian novelists
Australian male novelists
Living people
Australian gay writers
Writers from Brisbane
21st-century Australian male writers
21st-century LGBT people